Ken Appleby (born April 10, 1995) is a Canadian professional ice hockey goaltender currently playing for the Worcester Railers in the ECHL while under contract to the New York Islanders of the National Hockey League (NHL). He has previously played in the NHL with the New Jersey Devils.

Playing career
On October 5, 2015, Appleby signed a three-year entry-level contract with the New Jersey Devils of the National Hockey League (NHL). On January 20, 2018, Appleby made his NHL debut in a 3–1 loss to the Philadelphia Flyers, saving 24 shots when he replaced Keith Kinkaid. Appleby was sent back down to the AHL on February 4, 2018.

Despite making his NHL debut the final season of his entry-level deal, Appleby as an impending restricted free agent was not tendered a qualifying offer by the New Jersey Devils on June 25, 2018. As a free agent, Appleby secured a one-year AHL contract with the Manitoba Moose, affiliate to the Winnipeg Jets, on July 3, 2018.

During the 2018–19 season, having split time between the Moose and ECHL affiliate, the Jacksonville Icemen, before Appleby was signed to add depth and insurance to the Winnipeg Jets, agreeing to a one-year, two-way contract for the remainder of the season on February 25, 2019. Appleby was assigned to continue in the ECHL with the Icemen.

On June 25, 2019, at the conclusion of his contract with the Jets, Appleby was not tendered a qualifying offer, releasing him as a free agent. On July 9, 2019, Appleby agreed to continue in the AHL, signing a one-year contract with the Milwaukee Admirals, affiliate to the Nashville Predators. 

On February 5, 2021, Appleby signed with the Bridgeport Sound Tigers of the AHL, adding depth for the 2020–21 season. Approaching the final stages of the regular season, Appleby was signed by parent affiliate, the New York Islanders, to a two-year, two-way contract on April 9, 2021.

Career statistics

Awards and honours

References

External links
 

1995 births
Living people
Adirondack Thunder players
Albany Devils players
Binghamton Devils players
Bridgeport Islanders players
Bridgeport Sound Tigers players
Canadian ice hockey goaltenders
Florida Everblades players
Ice hockey people from Ontario
Jacksonville Icemen players
Manitoba Moose players
New Jersey Devils players
Oshawa Generals players
Sportspeople from North Bay, Ontario
Undrafted National Hockey League players
Worcester Railers players